Cinematique is the first of three in a series of albums by Paul Haig, subtitled "Themes to Unknown Films". The album, which is divided into three "suites", was released by LTM in 1991.

The suites are: City Of Fun, Lagondola and Flashback.

The album was re-released by LTM in February 2004. Artwork and track listing were identical to the original release.

Track listing 
"Black Veil and Gold"
"City Of Fun"
"Somewhere In between"
"The Hunting Party"
"Crime Interlude"
"City Of Fun (Slight Return)"
"Lagondola 1"
"Beauty"
"Highland"
"Deception"
"Intimacy"
"Lagondola 2"
"Flashback"
"Eastworld"
"In-Flight Entertainment"
"Oil"

Paul Haig albums
1991 albums